Lalaji is a Hindi Language film. It was released in 1942. The film starred Yashodhra Katju, Yakub, Amar, Sunalini Devi, Krishnakant and Maya Devi. It was directed by Chamankant Gandhi and Lalit Mehta for National Studios with music composed by Vasant Kumar Naidu.

References

External links

1942 films
1940s Hindi-language films
Indian drama films
1942 drama films
Indian black-and-white films
Hindi-language drama films